 is a Japanese artist and photographer, whose photographs often show his artworks in the open air.

Born Masaaki Komoto (Komoto Masaaki) in Ōmori-ku, Tokyo (now Ōta-ku, Tokyo) on 14 August 1935, Komoto was brought up in Seki, Gifu Prefecture. He studied at Gifu University, graduating in 1958; and until 1962 at the graduate school of Tokyo University of Education (now Tsukuba University).

Nomoto has created paintings, prints and photographs from the 1960s. From the 1980s these have gained critical acclaim outside Japan, bringing Nomoto invitations to Spain and elsewhere in Europe.

From 1971 to 1974 Nomoto taught at Gifu College of Education (now Gifu Shotoku Gakuen University); since 1994 he has been teaching at Joshibi University of Art and Design.

Exhibitions

One-man exhibitions
Gallery Stratford, Art Gallery of Greater Victoria, and elsewhere in North America, 1994–2000
"Fūkei to no kōkan: Komoto Akira ten", Gifu Collection of Modern Arts 1998
"Komoto Akira ten", Minokamo City Museum 2004
"60 nendai to genzai: Komoto Akira ten", Eizō & Tōichi Katō Memorial Art Museum, 2005
"Shizen to no kōkan",　Komoto Akira ten", Hekinan-shi Tetsugaku-taiken-mura Mugaen, 2008
"Shizen e / shizen kara", Gifu Collection of Modern Arts, 2008.

Other exhibitions
"Gendai bijutsu no dōkōten", National Museum of Modern Art, Kyoto 1965 	
"Gendai bijutsu ni okeru shashinten", National Museum of Modern Art, Tokyo and National Museum of Modern Art, Kyoto 1983
Echigo-Tsumari Art Triennial 2003 2000/2003

Collections
Bibliothèque nationale de France (Paris); Hyōgo Prefectural Museum of Art; Kunsthalle Düsseldorf; Museum of Contemporary Art Tokyo; Museum of Fine Arts, Gifu; Museum of Modern Art, Kamakura and Hayama; National Museum of Modern Art, Kyoto; National Museum of Modern Art, Tokyo; Tokyo Metropolitan Museum of Photography; Victoria and Albert Museum (London);.

Notes

External links
Photographs by Komoto

Japanese photographers
1935 births
Living people
People from Tokyo
People from Gifu Prefecture
Academic staff of Gifu Shotoku Gakuen University
University of Tsukuba alumni
Academic staff of Joshibi University of Art and Design